Nebojša Pavković (born 10 April 1946) is a Serbian retired army general who served as Chief of the General Staff of the Armed Forces of Yugoslavia from February 2000 to June 2002. He also served as the Commandeer of Third Army of the Armed Forces of Yugoslavia during the Kosovo War, from December 1998 to February 2000.

In 2009, he was convicted by the International Criminal Tribunal for the former Yugoslavia (ICTY) of committing crimes against humanity and war crimes in the Kosovo War.

Education and military career
Pavković was born in the village of Senjski Rudnik (Despotovac municipality) on 10 April 1946. He finished teacher training college in Aleksinac in 1966, and was conscripted into the Yugoslav People's Army (JNA) on 20 July 1970. Pavković graduated from the Military Academy in Belgrade in 1970, finished junior officers' school in 1982 and senior officers' school in 1988. He served as a battalion commander within the 10th Infantry Brigade and later headed the 16th Proletarian Infantry Regiment. From 1988 to 1989, he was the commander of the 16th Motorized Brigade. Between 1988 and 1993, he held several posts in the Federal Secretariat for National Defence.

When the conflict in Kosovo began, Pavković was the commander of the Third Army. He was promoted in rank Major General in 1996, Lieutenant General in 1998, Colonel General in 1999. For success as commander leadership he received numerous medals and awards, Slobodan Milošević awarded him the Medal of Freedom for commanding the Third Army during NATO's Operation Allied Force. After 5 October 2000, Pavković remained at his position as Chief of the General Staff until 24 June 2002, when he was removed from his position by the President of FR Yugoslavia Vojislav Koštunica.

ICTY trial and sentence

On 25 April 2005, Pavković was surrendered to the International Criminal Tribunal for the Former Yugoslavia (ICTY) in The Hague where he was charged with committing crimes against humanity and war crimes during the Kosovo War.

On 26 February 2009, the ICTY convicted Pavković of the charges and sentenced him to 22 years in prison. His sentence was upheld in January 2014.

He has been serving his sentence in Finland since 2014.

Publications
He published two books, which covered events which led to the Kosovo War and military events during the 1999 NATO bombing of Yugoslavia on the Kosovo battlefield. The published books are:
 The smell of gunpowder and death in Kosovo and Metohija in 1998 (2015)
 78 days of Third Army in the embrace of Merciful Angel (2018)

Notes

References

External links
 INTERVJU: General Nebojša Pavković - Nisam izdao Miloševića, pretio je građanski rat! (16.9.2018) at youtube.com 

1946 births
Living people
People from Despotovac
Serbian generals
Generals of the Yugoslav People's Army
Candidates for President of Serbia
People convicted by the International Criminal Tribunal for the former Yugoslavia
Serbian people convicted of crimes against humanity
Serbian people convicted of war crimes
Serbian people imprisoned abroad
Prisoners and detainees of Finland